Flight 33 Productions is an American documentary production company founded in 2006 that specializes in programs about history and science. It produces programs for The History Channel, The Discovery Channel, The National Geographic Channel, 3net, H2, The Weather Channel, Spike and Comcast.

Flight 33 is led by Executive Producers Louis Tarantino and Douglas Cohen and is based in Los Angeles, California.

Shows 
The company's credits include the Emmy Award winning documentary A Distant Shore: African Americans of D-Day, the Emmy Nominated special Life After People, Doomsday: 10 Ways The World Will End, and the popular History series The Universe. Flight 33 also produced season two of the History series Shootout! and the 2007 special Siberian Apocalypse.

Recent productions include, Rocket City Rednecks, "History of the World in 2 Hours", Navajo Cops, and "When Aliens Attack".

Flight 33 programs also include Battle 360° (2008), "Biblical Mysteries Explained" (2008), Life After People (2009), Patton 360° (2009),  "Seven Deadly Sins" (2009), and "Prehistoric" (2009).

In 2011, Rocket City Rednecks premiered as the highest rated new series of the year for the National Geographic Channel. That same year, they and Spike TV created a TV special called, "Alternate History", which regards Nazi Germany turning the U.S. into a satellite state after winning the Second World War as a result from turning the tables on the D-day invasion. However, this scenario is flawed in several ways. In 2014, they produced the show called, "Codes and Conspiracies", which explains different conspiracy theories. It went on for three seasons until 2016.

Flight 33 has also produced over twenty-five 3D programs, including the first ever 3D TV documentary - The Universe: Seven Wonders of The Solar System for History and Sky. Other 3D projects include, The Universe: Season Six, WW2 in 3D, History of the World in Two Hours, the 3D series Forgotten Planet and Live Fire for 3Net, and Roller Coasters, Perfecting Parkour, and The Colt Gun Factory for Comcast's Xfinity.

Awards 
A Distant Shore - 2008 Emmy Award for Outstanding Historical Programming - Long Form

Big History - 2014 Emmy Award for Outstanding Graphic Design and Art Direction

History of the World in 2 Hours - 2011 Emmy Nomination For Outstanding Individual Achievement In Craft: Graphic Design & Art Direction

Life After People - 2008 Emmy Nomination For Outstanding Writing For Nonfiction Programming; 2008 Emmy Nomination For Outstanding Special Visual Effects For A Miniseries, Movie Or Special

Shootout - 2006 Emmy Nomination For Outstanding Individual Achievement In A Craft: Graphic And Artistic Design

Wild West Tech - 2006 Emmy Nomination For Outstanding Individual Achievement In A Craft: Graphic And Artistic Design

References

External links

Television production companies of the United States
Documentary film production companies